Saturnalia ("Seven Books of the Saturnalia") is a work written after  431 CE by the Roman provincial Macrobius Theodosius (b.  390 CE - d. ?). The Saturnalia consists of an account of the discussions held at the house of Vettius Agorius Praetextatus during the holiday of the Saturnalia. It contains a great variety of curious historical, mythological, critical, antiquarian and grammatical discussions. "The work takes the form of a series of dialogues among learned men at a fictional banquet." There is little attempt to give any dramatic character to the dialogue; in each book some one of the personages takes the leading part, and the remarks of the others serve only as occasions for calling forth fresh displays of erudition.

Contents

The first book is devoted to an inquiry as to the origin of the Saturnalia and the festivals of Janus, which leads to a history and discussion of the Roman calendar, and to an attempt to derive all forms of worship from that of the Sun. The second book begins with a collection of bons mots, to which all present make their contributions, many of them being ascribed to Cicero and Augustus; a discussion of various pleasures, especially of the senses, then seems to have taken place, but almost the whole of this is lost. The third, fourth, fifth and sixth books are devoted to Virgil, dwelling respectively on his learning in religious matters, his rhetorical skill, his debt to Homer (with a comparison of the art of the two) and to other Greek writers, and the nature and extent of his borrowings from the earlier Latin poets. The latter part of the third book is taken up with a dissertation upon luxury and the sumptuary laws intended to check it, which is probably a dislocated portion of the second book. The seventh book consists largely of the discussion of various physiological questions.

The primary value of the work lies in the facts and opinions quoted from earlier writers. The form of the Saturnalia is copied from Plato's Symposium and Gellius's Noctes atticae; the chief authorities (whose names, however, are not quoted) are Gellius, Seneca the philosopher, Plutarch (Quaestiones conviviales), Athenaeus and the commentaries of Servius and others on Virgil.

Editions and translations
 Robert A. Kaster (ed.), Macrobius: Saturnalia. Loeb classical library 510–512. Cambridge, MA/ London:  Harvard University Press, 2011. 3 volumes.
 Percival Vaughan Davies (trans.), Macrobius: The Saturnalia. New York: Columbia University Press, 1969.

External Links
Latin text on LacusCurtius
Loeb Classical Library edition

References

5th-century Latin books
Gallo-Roman religion